Blackstone Underground is a 1976 historical thriller novel by the British writer Derek Lambert, published under the pen name Richard Falkirk. It is the fifth in a series of six novels featuring Edmund Blackstone, a member of the Bow Street Runners in the pre-Victorian era.  While trying to decide how to rescue a boy sentenced to death from Newgate Prison, Blackstone is called upon to thwart a gang plotting to rob the Bank of England.

References

Bibliography
 Bill Pronzini & Marcia Muller. 1001 Midnights: The Aficionado's Guide to Mystery and Detective Fiction. Arbor House, 1986.

1976 British novels
Novels by Derek Lambert 
British historical novels
British thriller novels
Novels set in London
Novels set in the 1820s
Methuen Publishing books